Edith Stauber (born in 1968 in Linz, Austria) is an Austrian film director and illustrator.

Biography
After training as a carpenter, Stauber studied at the University of Arts Linz in 1993 in the master class for visual media design and film and video. Since 1994 she works in the field of documentary and short film, especially in drawing and animation.

Stauber lives in Linz, and has taken part in international film festivals since 2005. She created the trailer for the Crossing Europe Film Festival in 2011.

Filmography

Animation
 2008: Eintritt zum Paradies um 3€20
 2011: Nachbehandlung
 2014: Linz / Martinskirche
 2015: 3 Miniaturen aus dem Leben mit 47
 2017: Stunden Minuten Tage
 2019: Linz / Stadtpfarrkirche

Documentaries
 1995: Oma´s Stimme
 2001: Der Maler schaut nicht hin
 2001: Die Zeit ist da
 2003: Nennen Sie drei Künstlerinnen
 2004: Über eine Strasse

External links
 
 Edith Stauber's Website

References

1968 births
Living people
20th-century Austrian women artists
21st-century Austrian women artists
Austrian contemporary artists
Austrian film directors
Austrian women film directors
Austrian women illustrators
Austrian documentary film directors
People from Linz
Women documentary filmmakers